The 1913 Pittsburgh mayoral election was held on Tuesday, November 4, 1913, in Pittsburgh, Pennsylvania. Joseph G. Armstrong was elected mayor of Pittsburgh over Stephen G. Porter in a nonpartisan election.

Background
The election in 1913 was the first Pittsburgh mayoral contest to be conducted under a new nonpartisan ballot law that eliminated party labels from ballots and replaced the party primaries with a nonpartisan blanket primary.

In the early stages of the campaign, support formed around two candidates, public works director Joseph G. Armstrong and U.S. Representative Stephen G. Porter. Incumbent mayor William A. Magee, who by law was ineligible to run for a consecutive term, gave his support to Porter, as did longtime political boss William Flinn. U.S. Senators George T. Oliver and Boies Penrose and local Republican leader Max G. Leslie backed Armstrong.

Primary election
There were six official candidates in the primary. Although the candidates were officially non-partisan, the press identified Armstrong and Porter as Republicans, Frank I. Gosser as a Democrat, William J. Van Essen as a Socialist, and Robert S. Glass as a Prohibitionist. Victor Breitenstein styled himself as "the workingmen's independent candidate" but rejected a socialist label.

Porter was the top vote-getter, edging second-place Armstrong by 302 votes. The rest of the candidates together captured less than 10 percent of the vote, but this was enough to keep either Porter or Armstrong from attaining a majority.

Runoff
As no candidate received a majority of votes in the primary, a runoff election was held between the top two finishers, Porter and Armstrong. This time Armstrong came out ahead of Porter, by a margin of 2,440 votes.

References

1913
1913 United States mayoral elections
November 1913 events
1913 Pennsylvania elections